Turp (also Romanized as tūrp; also known as terp and trp) is a village in Rudqat Rural District, Sufian District, Shabestar County, East Azerbaijan Province, Iran. At the 2006 census, its population was 726, in 208 families.

References 

Populated places in Shabestar County